VA-11 may refer to:

Attack Squadron 11 (U.S. Navy)
Virginia State Route 11 (disambiguation)
Virginia's 11th congressional district
VA-11 (Valladolid), a highway in Spain
VA-11 HALL-A, a simulation video game